Joseph Hardcastle may refer to:
 Joseph Hardcastle (1752–1819), English merchant and a founder of The Missionary Society
 Joseph Hardcastle (politician), British Liberal Party MP 
 Joseph Alfred Hardcastle, FRAS (1868–1917), grandson of Joseph Hardcastle (politician) appointed Director of Armagh Observatory just before his death
 Joseph Hardcastle (accountant) (died 1906), American Certified Public Accountant